Francesco Banchini (born 24 September 1974, Pozzuoli, Italy) is an Italian musician who plays many instruments, primarily clarinet. His main influences are the Medieval, Italian, Eastern European and Middle Eastern music.

At the age of 14 he began to learn in the Conservatorio di San Pietro a Majella of Naples. Between 1989 and 1995 he was an active live musician as a soloist and with a clarinet trio, what split up later, in 1998. During this era, he founded G.O.R. in 1992. Usually he plays every instrument on its releases, but plays concerts with guest musicians. G.O.R. produced many albums and appeared in numerous compilations. Francesco played as a guest musician with several bands.

From 2010 Francesco performed with La Scala Philharmonic Orchestra and in 2012 with The Qatar Philharmonic Orchestra. Currently, he works freelance with the BBC Orchestra.
 
His research commenced in 2010, focuses on designing experiences which maximise students' learning and engagement, by creating meaningful connections between learners, the Facilitators and the wider community. In 2015 Francesco presented his research at New York University, Steinhardt (IMPACT Conference). During 2016, he presented his research at Drew University (Transatlantic conference) in Ireland and at the International Society for Music Education (ISME) conference in Scotland, and at the ECIS Leadership Conference in Rome.

At the present time, he is studying the relationship between different curricula and is working on improving traditional methodologies with the purpose to inspire, motivate and develop creativity in both students and teachers.

He has written three film scores: Honey (2003), Ramallah (2005), and Sur (2005).

Releases

Christos (1993)
Genocidio di Ordine Religioso (1994)
Cybernos (1995)
Iniziazione (1996)
Entrar sen braz (1997)
Dicearchia (1997)
Ruha d'Qudsha (1998)
Solitudo corpus (1999)
Bellum Gnosticorum (2000)
Ialdabaoth (2001)
Phlegraei (2002)
Qumran (2003)
Temporis Recurrens (DVD) (2003)
Croisades (2004)
Amore & Tradimento (2004) – (Released in the US under the title Ciganko in 2005.)
Baqshish (2007)
Greta (single) (2012)
Dante (single) (2014)
Shashamane (single) (2015)
Sfiorando il cielo (single) (2015)
Maria Elena (single) (2015)

Film scores
Honey (2004)
Ramallah (2005)
Sur (2005)

Contributions

Lys
Roi Lune (2001)
Mélisse (2004)

Ataraxia
Suenos (2001)
Mon Soul Desir (2002)
A Calliope... collection (2002)

Others
Soleil (w/ Jack or Jive) (2002)
Love Sessions (2002)
Segesta (w/ Lino Cannavacciuolo italian violinist) (2002)
Alabaster (w/ Louisa John Krol) (2003)
Three living Three dead (w/ The Soil Bleeds Black) (2003)
Babilon (w/ Morpheus, a Spanish band) (2003)
Enrico Del Gaudio (2003)
Love Sessions 2 (2004)
U'Ciuccio (w/ Massimo Ferrante italian singer/guitarist) (2005)
The Spirit Rises (Khvarena) (2007)

Publications
Il concetto di notazione musicale (2013) 
Arabic music notation (2016)

Conference
Lecture at NYU Steinhardt - IMPACT Conference (2015) 
Lecture at Drew University Ireland - Transatlantic connection conference (2016)
Lecture at ECIS Leadership Conference - Rome (2016)

Orchestras
BBC Philharmonic Orchestra (2015–2016) 
Qatar Philharmonic Orchestra (2012–2014)
La Scala Philharmonic Orchestra (2010–2012)

References

External links
Info page at the website of Prikosvenie
Francesco Banchini on YouTube
Francesco Banchini on SoundCloud

1974 births
Living people
Prikosnovénie artists
Italian musicians
Neofolk